Anthony Thompson may refer to:

 Anthony Thompson (American football) (born 1967), former American football running back
 Anthony Thompson (Canadian football) (born 1990), Canadian football defensive back
 Anthony Thompson (boxer) (born 1981), American middleweight boxer
 Anthony Thompson (Gaelic footballer) (born 1986), Donegal player
 Anthony Thompson (politician), MP for Cambridge
 Antony Worrall Thompson (born 1951), British chef
 Anthony Thompson, bassist in Channel 3

See also
 Tony Thompson (disambiguation)
Anthony Thomson (disambiguation)